James McKernan  (born 1964) is a mathematician, and a professor of mathematics at the University of California, San Diego. He was a professor at MIT from 2007 until 2013.

Education
McKernan was educated at the Campion School, Hornchurch, and Trinity College, Cambridge, before going on to earn his Ph.D. from Harvard University in 1991. His dissertation, On the Hyperplane Sections of a Variety in Projective Space, was supervised by Joe Harris.

Recognition
McKernan was the joint winner of the Cole Prize in 2009, and joint recipient of the Clay Research Award in 2007.  Both honors were received jointly with his colleague Christopher Hacon. He gave an invited talk at the International Congress of Mathematicians in 2010, on the topic of "Algebraic Geometry". He was the joint winner (with Christopher Hacon) of the 2018 Breakthrough Prize in Mathematics.

He was elected as a Fellow of the American Mathematical Society in the 2020 Class, for "contributions to algebraic geometry, in particular his proof of the finite generation of the canonical ring, the existence of flips and the boundedness of varieties of log general type".

References

External links

Citation for 2009 Cole Prize in Algebra
The work of Hacon and McKernan

1964 births
Living people
Algebraic geometers
20th-century British mathematicians
21st-century British mathematicians
Alumni of Trinity College, Cambridge
Harvard University alumni
University of California, Santa Barbara faculty
Clay Research Award recipients
Fellows of the Royal Society
Fellows of the American Mathematical Society
Simons Investigator